Y5 may refer to:
 a Chinese copy of the Soviet Antonov An-2
 the abbreviation of "Year 5", the fifth year of study
 Pace Airlines IATA code
 Y-5 cusping pattern found in hominoid molars
 LNER Class Y5, a class of British steam locomotives